Anthony Joseph "Antone" Williamson (born July 18, 1973) is an American former Major League Baseball (MLB) first baseman who played for the Milwaukee Brewers in 1997.

Amateur career
Williamson attended Arizona State University, and in 1992 he played collegiate summer baseball with the Harwich Mariners of the Cape Cod Baseball League.

Professional career
Williamson was a first-round draft pick (fourth overall) by the Milwaukee Brewers in the 1994 MLB Draft.  He played minor league baseball for most of his career, and had a .271 batting average, and 415 hits in his six-year minor-league career.

Williamson's only Major League action came in a 24-game stint in 1997 for the Brewers. In those 24 games, he recorded a .204 average. He played first base, and occasionally pinch-hit. He left affiliated baseball in 2000 to play for the independent Greenville Bluesmen of the Texas–Louisiana League, after which he retired.

See also
1993 College Baseball All-America Team

References

External links

Major League Baseball first basemen
Living people
Milwaukee Brewers players
1973 births
Baseball players from California
Harwich Mariners players
Helena Brewers players
Stockton Ports players
El Paso Diablos players
New Orleans Zephyrs players
Tucson Toros players
Louisville Redbirds players
Huntsville Stars players
Louisville RiverBats players
People from Harbor City, Los Angeles
Arizona State Sun Devils baseball players